A metallophyte is a plant that can tolerate high levels of heavy metals such as lead. Such plants range between "obligate metallophytes" (which can only survive in the presence of these metals), and "facultative metallophytes" which can tolerate such conditions but are not confined to them.

European examples include alpine pennycress (Thlaspi caerulescens), the zinc violet (Viola calaminaria), spring sandwort (Minuartia verna), sea thrift (Armeria maritima), Cochlearia, common bent (Agrostis capillaris) and plantain (Plantago lanceolata). Few metallophytes are known from Latin America.

Metallophytes commonly exist as specialised flora found on spoil heaps of mines.

Such plants have potential for use for phytoremediation of contaminated ground.

See also
Hyperaccumulator
List of hyperaccumulators
Calaminarian grassland

References

Ecology terminology
Plants by adaptation